The Sandman is an American fantasy drama television series based on the 1989–1996 comic book written by Neil Gaiman and published by DC Comics. The series was developed by Gaiman, David S. Goyer, and Allan Heinberg for the streaming service Netflix and is produced by DC Entertainment and Warner Bros. Television. Like the comic, The Sandman tells the story of Dream/Morpheus, the titular Sandman. The series stars Tom Sturridge as the title character, with Boyd Holbrook, Vivienne Acheampong, and Patton Oswalt in supporting roles.

Efforts to adapt The Sandman to film began in 1991 but floundered in development hell for many years. In 2013, Goyer pitched a film adaptation of the series to Warner Bros. Goyer and Gaiman were set to produce alongside Joseph Gordon-Levitt, who was planned to star and possibly direct. However, Gordon-Levitt exited over creative differences in 2016. Due to the prolonged development of the film, Warner Bros. shifted its focus to television. Netflix signed a deal to produce the series in June 2019, and filming lasted from October 2020 to August 2021.

The Sandman premiered on August 5, 2022, with an additional episode premiering on August 19. In November 2022, it was renewed for a second season. The series has received generally positive reviews from critics, with praise going towards the casting, production design, costumes, faithfulness to its source material, visual effects, and performances, particularly those of Sturridge and David Thewlis.

Premise 
Morpheus, the personification of dreams and one of the seven Endless, is captured in an occult ritual in 1916. After being held captive for 106 years, Dream escapes and sets out to restore order to his realm, the Dreaming.

Cast

Main 
 Tom Sturridge as Lord Morpheus / Dream, the personification of dreams and nightmares and the ruler of the Dreaming.
 Sturridge also voiced his black cat counterpart in "Dream of a Thousand Cats".
 Boyd Holbrook as the Corinthian (season 1), a nightmare who escaped the Dreaming.
 Vivienne Acheampong as Lucienne, the librarian of the Dreaming and its caretaker in Dream's absence.
 Patton Oswalt as the voice of Matthew the Raven, Dream's emissary.

Co-starring  

 David Thewlis as John Dee, Cripps and Burgess's son whose endeavor to find "truth" jeopardizes the world. Gaiman described Dee as a character "who could break your heart and keep your sympathy while taking you into the darkest places".
 Jenna Coleman as Johanna Constantine, an occult detective. Coleman plays two versions of the character: the present-day descendant based on John Constantine and her identical eighteenth-century ancestor, Lady Johanna Constantine.
 Gwendoline Christie as Lucifer Morningstar, the ruler of Hell. This series' incarnation of Lucifer is much closer to the character's original depiction in the comics than his depiction in the 2016 Lucifer television series. Neil Gaiman noted that it would be difficult to reconfigure the Lucifer version (portrayed by Tom Ellis) so he would fit back into The Sandman.
 Kirby Howell-Baptiste as Death, the personification of death and Dream's kinder, wiser sister.
 Ferdinand Kingsley as Hob Gadling, Dream's friend who has lived for hundreds of years
 Sandra James-Young as Unity Kinkaid (season 1), Rose's benefactor and great-grandmother who has recently awakened from a century-long slumber
 Kyo Ra as Rose Walker, a young woman searching for her lost brother who becomes a prey of the Corinthian.
 Razane Jammal as Lyta Hall, Rose's friend and a widow mourning her husband.
 Melissanthi Mahut as Calliope, Homer's muse and Dream/Morpheus's ex-wife
 Arthur Darvill as Richard "Ric" Madoc, a struggling author who imprisons Calliope against her will.

Recurring 

 Joely Richardson as Ethel Dee (née Cripps) / Madame Daudet, Burgess's mistress and the mother of John Dee (season 1)
 Niamh Walsh as young Ethel Cripps (season 1).
 Nina Wadia as the Fate Mother
 Souad Faress as the Fate Crone
 Dinita Gohil as the Fate Maiden
 Gianni Calchetti as the Death Stalker, a serial killer.
 Asim Chaudhry as Abel, a resident of the Dreaming based on the Biblical Abel.
 Sanjeev Bhaskar as Cain, a resident of the Dreaming and Abel's brother based on the Biblical Cain.
 Mason Alexander Park as Desire, the personification of desire and Morpheus' sibling
 Cassie Clare as Mazikeen of the Lilim, a devoted ally of Lucifer Morningstar.
 John Cameron Mitchell as Hal Carter, Rose's friend and host of the bed and breakfast. Hal also moonlights as a drag queen and cabaret performer.
 Stephen Fry as Gilbert / Fiddler's Green (season 1), a mysterious gentleman who becomes Rose's bodyguard.
 Mark Hamill as the voice of Mervyn Pumpkinhead, a chain-smoking janitor with a jack-o'-lantern for a head.
 Donna Preston as Despair, the personification of despair, Morpheus' sister, and Desire's twin
 Lloyd Everitt as Hector Hall (season 1), Lyta's deceased husband whose ghost hides from Death in The Dreaming.
 Eddie Karanja as Jed Walker, Rose's younger brother and the ward of Gault who protects him from his abusive foster parents via The Dreaming.
 Andi Osho as Miranda Walker, Unity's granddaughter and Jed and Rose's mother.
 Osho also portrays Gault, an escaped nightmare from the Dreaming.
 Ann Ogbomo portrays Gault's true form who seeks to become a Dream while protecting children from abuse.
 Cara Horgan and Daisy Badger as Chantal and Zelda, guests at Hal's B&B.
 Lily Travers and Richard Fleeshman as Barbie and Ken, guests at Hal's B&B.
 Sam Hazeldine and Lisa O'Hare as Barnaby and Clarice, Jed's foster parents. Barnaby is physically abusive towards Jed and terrifies Clarice into compliance.
 Kerry Shale, Danny Kirrane, and Jill Winternitz as Nimrod, Fun Land, and The Good Doctor (season 1), a trio of serial killers.
 Lenny Henry as the voice of Martin Tenbones, a magical, dog-like creature who appears in the dreams of Barbie.

Guest 

 Bill Paterson as Dr. John Hathaway (season 1)
 Laurie Kynaston as Alex Burgess, Roderick Burgess' son (season 1)
 Benjamin Evan Ainsworth as young Alex Burgess (season 1)
 Benedick Blythe as older Alex Burgess (season 1)
 Charles Dance as Sir Roderick Burgess / Magus (season 1), an aristocratic occultist.
 Meera Syal as Erica, a vicar known as "Ric the Vic" who seeks out Johanna Constantine's help with a demonic possession.
 Claire Higgins as Mad Hettie, a 280-year-old homeless woman and acquaintance of Johanna Constantine
 Sarah Niles as Rosemary, a good Samaritan woman who helps John retrieve his ruby.
 Martyn Ford as Squatterbloat, a demon
 Munya Chawawa as Choronzon, a demon-duke of Hell
 Deborah Oyelade as Nada, a prehistoric African queen who was once romantically involved with Morpheus
 Ernest Kingsley Jnr as Kai'ckul, an aspect of Dream seen through the eyes of Nada.
 Sam Strike as Todd
 Emma Duncan as Bette Munroe (season 1), a waitress and one of John Dee's victims
 Steven Brand as Marsh Janowski (season 1), a diner staff and one of John Dee's victims
 Laurie Davidson as Mark Brewer (season 1), a diner guest and one of John Dee's victims
 Daisy Head as Judy (season 1), a diner guest and one of John Dee's victims
 James Udom as Garry (season 1), a diner guest and one of John Dee's victims
 Lourdes Faberes as Kate Fletcher (season 1), a diner guest and one of John Dee's victims
 Samuel Blenkin as Will Shaxberd, an aspiring playwright.
 Ian McNeice as a bartender
 Ben Wiggins as Carl, Rose's friend and house-sitter.
 Lewis Reeves as Philip Sitz (season 1), a man pretending to be "The Boogieman".
 Roger Allam as the voice of Lord Azazel, a Duke of Hell.
 Peter de Jersey as Mr. Haldewell, Unity Kincaid’s solicitor
 Derek Jacobi as Erasmus Fry (season 1), a writer of Greek mythology and the original captor of Calliope.

The animated episode "Dream of a Thousand Cats" features the voices of Sandra Oh as the Cat Prophet, Rosie Day as the Tabby Kitten, David Gyasi as the Grey Cat, Joe Lycett as the Black Cat, Neil Gaiman as the Skull Crow, James McAvoy as the Golden-Haired Man, David Tennant as Don, Georgia Tennant as Laura Lynn, Michael Sheen as Paul, Anna Lundberg as Marion, Nonso Anozie as the Wyvern, Diane Morgan as the Gryphon, and Tom Wu as the Pegasus.

Episodes

Production

Development

As a film 
Attempts to adapt The Sandman, an American comic book written by Neil Gaiman and published by DC Comics from 1989 to 1996, had languished in development hell since the 1990s. Inquisitr wrote that "Sandman nature as a comic has been a very unique and life-changing experience for many and that made it very difficult and challenging to translate into the small and big screens."

Gaiman was first asked about a film adaptation by DC's corporate sibling Warner Bros. in 1991, an offer to which he was apprehensive. Development on a film adaptation began in 1996, with Roger Avary attached to direct and Ted Elliot and Terry Rossio writing the script. Elliot and Rossio's script merged the first two Sandman storylines, Preludes & Nocturnes and The Doll's House, into a single story. While Gaiman enjoyed the script, Avary was fired due to creative issues with executive producer Jon Peters. Following this, William Farmer wrote a screenplay in 1998, which Gaiman did not like and called it "not only the worst Sandman script I've ever seen, but quite easily the worst script I've ever read." His script featured radical differences from the source material, such as casting Dream as a villain and making him Lucifer Morningstar's brother.

After reading Farmer's script, Gaiman became doubtful that The Sandman would be adapted into a film. In 2007, he remarked that he would "rather see no Sandman movie made than a bad Sandman movie", but added that he "[felt] like the time for a Sandman movie is coming soon. We need someone who has the same obsession with the source material as Peter Jackson had with Lord of the Rings or Sam Raimi had with Spider-Man." He said that he could see Terry Gilliam directing the adaptation: "I would always give anything to Terry Gilliam, forever, so if Terry Gilliam ever wants to do Sandman then as far as I'm concerned Terry Gilliam should do Sandman." In 2013, DC Entertainment president Diane Nelson said that a Sandman film was a project she considered a priority, considering the prospect as rich as the Harry Potter universe.

David S. Goyer, who had worked on the Dark Knight trilogy, pitched a Sandman adaptation to Warner Bros. in 2013 and by February 2014 was set to produce the film alongside Joseph Gordon-Levitt and Gaiman, with Jack Thorne writing. Warner Bros. planned for Gordon-Levitt to star and possibly direct. The film was set to be produced by New Line Cinema as part of a slate of films based on properties published under DC's Vertigo imprint, separate from the DC Extended Universe. Eric Heisserer was hired to rewrite the film's script in March 2016; immediately afterwards, Gordon-Levitt departed due to disagreements with Warner Bros. over the creative direction of the film. The following November, Heisserer turned in his draft but departed, stating that the project should be an HBO series instead of a film: "I … came to the conclusion that the best version of this property exists as an HBO series or limited series, not as a feature film, not even as a trilogy. The structure of the feature film really doesn't mesh with this."

Transition to television 
Due to the prolonged development period of the film, in 2010 DC Entertainment shifted focus onto developing a television adaptation. Film director James Mangold pitched a series concept to HBO while consulting with Gaiman on an unofficial basis, but it did not materialize due to a "political turf war at WB". It was reported in September 2010 that Warner Bros. Television was licensing the rights to produce a TV series, and that Supernatural creator Eric Kripke was their preferred candidate to adapt the saga. Gaiman later revealed that he disapproved of Kripke's take, and development on the television adaptation halted because Goyer's film was progressing smoothly.

Around 2018, Gaiman was working on the television adaption of Good Omens, the book he had cowritten with Terry Pratchett, when Goyer approached him again about a television adaption of The Sandman. By that point, Goyer had several additional successful screenplays including The Dark Knight trilogy. Goyer connected Gaiman to screenwriter Allan Heinberg, a fan of Gaiman's work. While Heinberg initially refused his offer to work on the series as he initially perceived it as "unfilmable", Goyer managed to convince him to do so as he was planning to adapt the comics as a series. Heinberg became the showrunner and executive producer and collaborated with Gaiman, who was also an executive producer, while creating the series.

In June 2019, Netflix signed a deal with Warner Bros. to produce the series and gave it an order of eleven episodes, the first ten of which were initially released together, and the eleventh as a bonus episode. According to The Hollywood Reporter, Warner Bros. pitched the series to multiple networks—including HBO, which declined to move ahead with it due to its massive budget. Netflix "snapped it up" as part of its attempts to obtain big intellectual properties and attract subscribers. The series was developed by Gaiman, Goyer, and Allan Heinberg, who also serve as executive producers. Gaiman said he would be more involved than he was with the 2017–2021 television adaptation of American Gods (2001) but less than he was with the 2019 adaptation of Good Omens (1990).

Writing 
The creative team sought to faithfully adapt the source material, beginning with the first season adapting Preludes & Nocturnes, The Doll's House, and the first two issues of Dream Country. The creators made significant narrative changes from the source material with Gaiman's approval and also received feedback while creating the sets, with Heinberg saying, "Everything gets Neil’s eyes and his feedback." The team was inspired by the art from the comics, with the props and sets being created to be faithful to the comics. The series features changes intended to modernize the source material for a contemporary audience. For example, it begins in 2021 rather than 1989, with Dream now having been imprisoned for 105 years instead of 75 years. Other characters were similarly updated, as "... if we were creating this character now, what gender would the character be? ... who would they be? What would they be doing?". Changes included expanding the role of The Corinthian into being the Big Bad for the first season, altering various characters and storylines, and removing references to other DC Comics characters such as Martian Manhunter and Mister Miracle. John Dee was not depicted as Doctor Destiny, and John Constantine was reimagined as a female character, Joanna Constantine. Gaiman opted to remove references to the DC Universe as the overall Sandman series moved away from the initial ties with the DC Universe to avoid potential implications that the series would tie into other DC Comics adaptions in the future. The role of Matthew was also expanded in the series for Morpheus to have someone with which he can share his thoughts, which were depicted as thought bubbles in the comics and impractical to do in live action. Gaiman was particular about Morpheus' dialogue in the series and described it as the "thing I [Gaiman] was most obsessive about". Upon rereading the comics, Gaiman felt he "in a weird way did all the work" as he thought the comics "had kind of been rather ahead of its time", with Heinberg adding, "The Sandman comics were leagues ahead of everybody in the late '80s in terms of the depiction of women, race, sexuality and gender", while noting that changes were made for the series.

Goyer, Heinberg, and Gaiman met at Gaiman's house to discuss the first season, where they came up with the story for the first episode in two days. They often discussed "Why is it essential that we tell the story of The Sandman right now?", with Heinberg stating that the answer "has informed every creative decision we’ve made since: The Sandman is an exploration of what it means to be human. To be mortal and therefore vulnerable. Capable of being hurt, but also capable of loving and being loved. The Sandman is the story of an honorable, arrogant king who slowly—very slowly—learns how to love. How to be a loving friend, a loving brother, a loving father." Goyer summarized the series as "a story about a god who, over the course of the story, sheds his godhood and becomes mortal and learns what it means to be mortal ... It’s a story about a really fucked-up dysfunctional family. The Endless, even though they are godlike beings, they all have their petty squabbles. Some of them hate each other. Some of them love each other. It’s just that when they have fights, entire worlds and universes suffer" and called it a melodrama. He opted to include the stand-alone issues in the series in which Morpheus did not appear since he felt that it was "one of the things that’s wonderful about Sandman" and felt those issues did not involve Morpheus but were set in that world. He added that Morpheus was sometimes a protagonist and catalyst for events in the series. He described Morpheus as a character who "cares about humanity in the abstract, but not in the specific". Gaiman also felt that the Sleeping Sickness epidemic in the series was "incredibly apt" due to "some incredibly dreamlike moments because we were shooting during a pandemic".

Writing for a potential second season had already begun by August 2022. Netflix confirmed they had green-lit a second season on November 2, 2022, following rumors earlier that day from DC Comics and Gaiman that the series had been renewed.

Casting 
Patton Oswalt, a longtime Sandman fan, was the first actor who was cast in the series; he was cast as the voice of Matthew the Raven the day before The Sandman was pitched to Netflix. In September 2020, Tom Sturridge entered negotiations to portray Dream, after screen testing alongside Tom York and Colin Morgan, while Liam Hemsworth and Dacre Montgomery were under consideration for the role of the Corinthian. Gaiman had said he had watched over 1,500 casting auditions for Morpheus and felt Sturridge was right for the role after watching his audition tapes. Sturridge had been unfamiliar with the source material but became a devoted fan after he was cast. Casting news was kept tightly under wraps and was not publicly released when the first season began filming. According to Boyd Holbrook, the casting process was long, recalling that he auditioned around January 2020 but did not receive any further information until September. In January 2021, Sturridge, Gwendoline Christie, Vivienne Acheampong, Holbrook, Charles Dance, Asim Chaudhry, and Sanjeev Bhaskar were announced to be starring in the series.

Twelve more cast members were announced in May 2021: Kirby Howell-Baptiste, Mason Alexander Park, Donna Preston, Jenna Coleman, Niamh Walsh, Joely Richardson, David Thewlis, Kyo Ra, Stephen Fry, Razane Jammal, Sandra James Young, and Oswalt. Park, who was also a fan of the source material, decided to contact Gaiman on Twitter for their role as Desire. Gaiman had sent their videos to Heinberg, who both agreed on casting Park. The second casting announcement was met with backlash from a section of the Sandman fanbase, with some criticizing the casting of black actors as characters traditionally depicted as white in the comics, such as Howell-Baptiste as Death. Mehrul Bari of The Daily Star felt that while the backlash against the casting announcement was clearly "rooted in flagrant phobias", some of the casting choices seemed like "stunt casting" that continued tokenism in Netflix productions and comic book adaptations. For example, Bari noted that aside from Death, the rest of the Endless, including Dream, were still played by white actors. Gaiman dismissed the fan backlash and defended both Baptiste's casting as Death and Park's casting as Desire, with the latter being depicted as androgynous in the comics.

Production design 
Costume designer Sarah Arthur worked closely with property master Gordon Fitzgerald to recreate items and costumes found in the comic book as accurately as possible. The Helmet of Dreams was designed by costumers to be four feet long and foldable, allowing it to be fitted inside a bag. Dream's ruby and bag of sand, like most items in the series, were created as physical objects and later enhanced by the visual effects team in post production. Lucifer's contrasting white and black costumes were designed by Giles Deacon with input from Gwendoline Christie. The team researched androgynous figures, including David Bowie, to intentionally convey Lucifer as an androgynous character. Wherever possible, the production team attempted to mimic the artwork from the source material, such as Lucienne's costume and glasses. For the set designs, the production team conducted research into various periods in history, particularly for the tavern scenes featuring Dream and Hob Gadling, which span several hundred years. The sets, costumes and props were redesigned for each century based on historical reference. To design the Palace of Dreaming, supervisor Ian Markiewicz took inspiration from the artwork of Kris Kuksi. Markiewicz conceived the palace as a "dream mosaic". He was opposed to creating scenes using full green screen stages, so most scenes were filmed on location and augmented, including Dream's throne room, which was represented by the interior of Guildford Cathedral. The team used St. Peter's Square as the inspiration for the design of the balcony and rear of Lucifer's Palace in reference to Lucifer as a fallen angel. Production designer Gary Steele created the set for the Threshold of Desire as a curved arch by carving foam blocks. For Episode 5, "24/7", Gaiman consulted with artist Mike Dringenberg about the original diner design in the comic book. Dringenberg provided him with the setting and menu of a real Salt Lake City diner, which was subsequently used in the show.

Filming 
The series was originally to begin filming towards the end of May 2020, but was delayed due to the COVID-19 pandemic. In September 2020, Gaiman revealed on his Twitter that filming was expected to begin in October "lockdown permitting". Principal photography began on October 15, 2020. Due to the COVID-19 pandemic, filming for the first season was limited to the United Kingdom. Holbrook began shooting his scenes in December 2020. Production for the first season was expected to last until June 2021. In August 2021, Gaiman revealed on his Tumblr account that the first season had wrapped filming.

Filming for the first season took place in Greater London, Surrey, Watford, Poole, and Sussex. As the production team was limited to filming in the United Kingdom, scenes set in New York City were filmed at Canary Wharf. Filming locations in Surrey included Shepperton Studios and Guildford Cathedral. Hankley Common was chosen as the filming location for Hell. Other prominent filming locations included Warner Bros. Studios, Leavesden in Watford, Sandbanks beach located in Poole and the town of Petworth.

Post-production 
The comic series' cover artist, Dave McKean, came out of retirement to design the end-credits sequences for each episode.

Visual effects 
To achieve the many visual effects in the series, One of Us and Untold Studios were hired to provide VFX shots for the first 11 episodes. One of Us supplied visual effects for several scenes, including a tower room ceiling sequence in which, "the stone walls break down like a fabric of reality", the backdrop for Desire's red room, and the visual effects for the Corinthian. Untold Studios supplied the effects for several sequences, including a scene in which Morpheus is engulfed in Hell, Stephen Fry's transformation into a forest as Fiddler's Green, and the animated cats in the bonus episode, A Dream Of A Thousand Cats. VFX supervisor James Hattsmith said that the VFX team approached the source material with an aim to, "bring it into the “real” world whilst balancing the feeling of the fantastical with maintaining tangibility." Other companies involved in creating the 2,900 visual effects for the show included Framestore, Industrial Light and Magic (ILM), Important Looking Pirates, Rodeo FX, Union FX and Chicken Bone VFX. Framestore created the visuals for Matthew the Raven, which required an intricate feather system, puppets and live-action ravens to create realistic visuals. Rodeo FX produced visual concepts for Morpheus' palace that took inspiration from various world sculptures. The Rodeo FX team conceived the palace's fall into ruin as a representation of the collective consciousness and consequently the palace "reflected a broad cultural context". For the entrance to The Dreaming, the Gate of Horn was moulded by production designer Jon Gary Steele in the form of a small 20 x 25 foot section that was used to augment a gate measuring 300 feet wide by 300 feet tall. The Undercroft in which Morpheus is imprisoned was built as a set with a moat, smoke, wind effects, flame bars and self-igniting candles. To create Lucifer's Palace, the VFX team was concerned about viewers' preconceived ideas of how it should appear and began by using Google Images to research previous depictions. The final design used a combination of traditional architecture and photorealistic imagery from the comic book.

Music 

The series was scored by British composer David Buckley, who was nominated for an Emmy Award in the Outstanding Theme Music category in 2017 for his work on The Good Fight. He used a wide range of sounds, from recordings with a large orchestra (at Synchron Stage Vienna and a choir to early music instruments such as the viola da gamba and baroque flutes, as well as esoteric sounds. He additionally combined these with modern electronic textures to "bridge time within the music."

Release 
The series was released on August 5, 2022, and consists of ten episodes. An eleventh episode was released on August 19 as a "two-part story collection".

Marketing 
Gaiman, Heinberg, and the cast promoted the series at San Diego Comic-Con in July 2022, where an official trailer debuted. Charles Pulliam-Moore of The Verge felt the trailer confirmed the series would retain the comic's "focus on the macabre" and featured "a sense of scale... that's hopefully going to be consistent throughout the show".

Reception

Audience viewership 
The Sandman ranked at number one globally on Netflix's Top 10 titles three days after its release with 69.5 million hours viewed. In its first full week of streaming, The Sandman remained the most-watched show on Netflix's weekly Top 10 list of the most-watched TV shows, with 127.5 million hours viewed between August 8–14. The Sandman remained the most-watched English-language TV show on Netflix for the third time in a row between August 15–21. The show had been watched over 393.14 million hours in total by September 18.

The show was the eighth most-watched English language show on Netflix of 2022 spending 7 weeks in the global top 10s.

Critical response 
The review aggregator website Rotten Tomatoes reported an approval rating of 87% with an average rating of 7.6/10, based on 97 critic reviews. The website's critics consensus reads, "While it may hold few surprises for fans of the source material, The Sandmans first season satisfyingly adapts an allegedly unfilmable classic." Metacritic, which uses a weighted average, assigned a score of 66 out of 100 based on 27 reviews, indicating "generally favorable reviews".

Amelia Emberwing of IGN gave a score of 9 out 10, praising the cast performances, particularly Sturridge's. She also praised the production values of the series, and felt that the series adapted its source material well, though was unsure if viewers who were unfamiliar with the source material would enjoy the series. The Guardian's Rebecca Nicholson gave it a four out of five stars and summarized it as "transportive, playful at times, and certainly grand." She also praised the performances, the delivery of dialogue, and its faithfulness to the source material and singled out the episode "24/7" as one of the best episodes of the year, though she expressed concerns as to how fans unfamiliar with the source material would enjoy the series.  Judy Berman of Time also gave a positive review, praising its production design and casting, while also highlighting the standalone episodes, calling the series "easily one of the best small-screen comic adaptations ever made." Similarly, Glen Weldon of NPR also gave a positive review, highlighting its accuracy to the source material and felt that its changes improved the narrative of the series, writing "the changes introduced into the adaptation offer intriguing new variations on now-familiar themes without erasing what we love". He also praised its visuals and the performances, especially Sturridge's, whom he felt "captures the competing aspects of Morpheus that are forever roiling under his impassive surface — his haughtiness, his wounded vulnerability; his stiffness, his longing for connection. Also, his brittle anger, his ability to — almost, not quite, but almost — laugh at himself". Iana Murray writing for GQ praised David Thewlis for his performance and opined that his portrayal of John Dee "delivers perhaps the show's standout performance". At Variety, Caroline Framke praised the narrative structure of the series and story, writing that it "metes out its material with an economical approach (no episode runs over 54 minutes)", but criticized some of the visual effects and use of computer-generated imagery (CGI) and felt it did not replicate the art from the comics. However, she did state that the episode "24/7" had the best visuals in the series. The series was ranked the tenth best TV show of 2022 by Entertainment.ie, with one of the website's writers saying, "The Sandman is one of the finest examples of escapist television this year. Under the expert guidance of comic book creator Neil Gaiman, Netflix was able to streamline this mind-bending and rich anthology into a cohesive and beautiful series full of characters that each had their own defining outlook on the world in which they lived - or survived - in". Los Angeles Times included the series in its unranked list of "10 best TV shows of 2022" and called it "a shimmering, magical, moving masterpiece that defies the odds". Meanwhile, Collider named it one of the best new TV shows of the year and wrote, "The Sandman introduces audiences to a rich, layered, enchanting world of pure imagination. Tom Sturridge delivers an amazingly accurate performance as the show's lead character Lord Morpheus. As a whole, the show has a fully realized screenplay and an outstanding cast that manages to present a full rounded fantasy series".

In a mixed review, Karama Horne of TheWrap called the series "visually stunning" and further praised its costumes, sound design, and the cast performances, while criticizing its pacing and noting that its "anthology style of storytelling" caused the plot to suffer, especially towards the season's end. Giving the series a B- grade, Sam Barsanti of The A.V. Club called The Sandman a "generic fantasy series" that is too faithful to its source material, "doing what is essentially the bare minimum in replicating an acclaimed work of art and transferring it into a different medium", though he praised some of the performances. CNN's Brian Lowry felt that the performances were "blunted by the narrative structure and dream-like storytelling". He gave a more critical review, praising its visuals, but noting the faithfulness to the source material as both a good and bad thing. He said that the "meticulous detail in replicating the look and tone [of the comic] doesn't create much emotional investment", noting the "episodic" chapters in the series which he thought negatively affected its pacing, but also felt that it would satisfy fans familiar with the source material. Writing for The Hollywood Reporter, Angie Han also noted its faithfulness to source material, and thought the series "prioritizes fidelity over creativity" which she thought "makes for a decent echo of the comics — but it stops well short of becoming a classic in its own right". She was mixed towards the changes in the series, saying they were "not too bad, and sometimes they're good", and praised the episode "The Sound of Her Wings" as the best in the series. She summarized her thoughts on the series by writing "it’s difficult not to notice that for a series all about the power of dreams to spark creativity, to inspire our best selves or our worst ones, to change the course of a life or a universe, The Sandman itself feels a bit short on imagination". In a negative review, Kelly Lawler of USA Today gave the series 1.5 out of 4 stars, calling the first season "a total failure", criticizing its pacing and its story, which she felt was "a pile of stories and moods randomly tossed on top of each other".

Accolades 
The series was nominated for Best Special Production at the 2023 Annie Awards.

Potential spin-off 
In October 2022, Johanna Constantine actress Jenna Coleman confirmed that she, Neil Gaiman, and Allan Heinberg had discussed a potential Johanna Constantine spin-off solo series of The Sandman about her character, stating that it was a "good idea" that they were "really behind".

Notes

References

External links 

 
 

2020s American drama television series
2020s American horror television series
2020s American LGBT-related drama television series
2020s American supernatural television series
2022 American television series debuts
American fantasy drama television series
American_fantasy_television_series
Dark fantasy television series
Demons in television
English-language Netflix original programming
Fiction about God
LGBT-related superhero television shows
Norse mythology in popular culture
Occult detective fiction
The Sandman (comic book)
Superhero television series
Television series about personifications of death
Television series based on works by Neil Gaiman
Television series by Warner Bros. Television Studios
Television series created by David S. Goyer
Television shows about dreams
Television shows based on DC Comics
Television shows filmed in the United Kingdom